The Oyo State House of Assembly is the legislative arm of the government  of Oyo State of Nigeria. It is a unicameral legislature with 33 members elected from the 33 local government areas of the state.

The fundamental functions of the Assembly are to enact new laws, amend or repeal existing laws and oversight of the executive. Members of the assembly are elected for a term of four years concurrent with federal legislators (Senate and House of Representatives) and governor of the state. The state assembly convenes three times a week (Tuesdays, Wednesdays and Thursdays) in the assembly complex within the state capital, Ibadan.

The current speaker of the Assembly is Adebo Ogundoyin.

References 

Oyo State
State legislatures of Nigeria
Government of Oyo State